Dire Straits is the debut studio album by the British rock band Dire Straits released on 9 June 1978 by Vertigo Records, internationally, Warner Bros. Records in the United States and Mercury Records in Canada. The album has the hit single "Sultans of Swing", which reached number 4 on the Billboard Hot 100 chart and number 8 on the UK Singles Chart. The album reached the top of the album charts in Germany, Australia and France, number 2 in the United States and number 5 in the United Kingdom. Dire Straits was later certified double platinum in both the United States and the United Kingdom.

Recording
Dire Straits was recorded at Basing Street Studios in London from 13 February to 5 March 1978. Knopfler used a few guitars for the recording, including a pair of red Fender Stratocasters—one from 1961 (serial number 68354) and one from 1962 (serial number 80470). He played his 1938 National Style O 14 fret guitar (serial number B1844) on "Water of Love" and "Wild West End". He also used a black Telecaster Thinline (serial number 226254) on "Setting Me Up". David played a black Fender Stratocaster and a Harmony Sovereign acoustic guitar. The album was produced by Muff Winwood, and engineered by Rhett Davies, assisted by Greg Cobb.

Release
The album was released in the US on 20 October 1978. The first single released was "Sultans of Swing" which first broke into the United States top five early in the spring of 1979, becoming a hit a full five months after the album was released there, and then reached number eight in the UK Singles Chart. "Water of Love" was also released as a single in some countries, and charted in Australia, reaching number 54, and in the Netherlands, reaching number 28.

"Sultans of Swing" was re-released as a single in the UK in November 1988 to promote the greatest hits compilation Money for Nothing, released in October that year.

The album was remastered and reissued with the rest of the Dire Straits catalogue in 1996 to most of the world excluding the U.S. and on 19 September 2000 in the United States.

Artwork
The album cover artwork is designed by Hothouse, who commissioned the cover painting from Chuck Loyola. The Dire Straits Fender logo, which appears on the back cover, was designed by Geoff Halpern.

Touring

Dire Straits promoted the release of their first single and album with the Dire Straits Tour, which started on 6 June 1978 at the Lafayette Club in Wolverhampton, included 55 shows, ending on 18 November 1978 at the College of Education in Hitchin. The European tour included concerts in the United Kingdom, France, Belgium, Germany and the Netherlands. These concerts presented Dire Straits with their largest audiences to that date. The first leg of the tour promoted their first single, "Sultans of Swing". This first leg took the band around Great Britain in June and July 1978, performing in England, Scotland and Wales. The band typically performed in small halls with a maximum capacity of 1,000. The second leg of the tour promoted the band's debut album. This leg took the band to several European countries, where they met journalists and performed on television programmes.

Critical reception

In a retrospective review for AllMusic, Stephen Thomas Erlewine gave the album four out of five stars, calling it "remarkably accomplished for a debut". Erlewine praised Knopfler's "spare, tasteful guitar lines and his husky warbling" and his "inclination toward Dylanesque imagery, which enhances the smoky, low-key atmosphere of the album".

In his review for Rolling Stone magazine, Ken Tucker wrote that the band "plays tight, spare mixtures of rock, folk and country music with a serene spirit and witty irony. It's almost as if they were aware that their forte has nothing to do with what's currently happening in the industry, but couldn't care less." Tucker singled out "Sultans of Swing" for its "inescapable hook" and "Bob Dylan-like snarl in its vocal". He also praised "Setting Me Up" as a "heavenly number, funny and bitter".

Track listing

Personnel

Dire Straits
 Mark Knopfler – vocals, lead and rhythm guitars
 David Knopfler – rhythm guitar, backing vocals
 John Illsley – bass guitar, backing vocals
 Pick Withers – drums

Production
 Rhett Davies – engineer
 Paddy Eckersley – photography
 Chuck Loyola – cover painting
 Bob Ludwig – remastering
 Alan Schmidt – art direction
 Muff Winwood – producer

Charts
Dire Straits spent 132 weeks on the UK Albums Chart.

Weekly charts

Year-end charts

Certifications and sales

Notes

References

External links
 Dire Straits at Mark Knopfler official website
 Dire Straits at Radio3Net

Dire Straits albums
1978 debut albums
Albums produced by Muff Winwood
Vertigo Records albums
Warner Records albums